Kenneth J. Meyer (born June 24, 1959) is an American businessman and former Republican politician.

From Chattanooga, Tennessee, Meyer owned an insurance business and served in the Tennessee House of Representatives.

Notes

1959 births
Living people
Politicians from Chattanooga, Tennessee
Businesspeople from Tennessee
Republican Party members of the Tennessee House of Representatives